McCrorey may refer to:

People
 John Graham McCrorey (1860–1923), American businessman
 Mary Jackson McCrorey (1867–1944), American educator, mission worker, and YWCA leader

Other uses
McCrory Stores, a retail chain founded by John Graham McCrorey

See also
McCrory (disambiguation)